Papurana grisea is a species of true frog. It is known with certainty only from its type locality in the Went Mountains, in the Indonesian province of Papua, New Guinea. Common names Went Mountains frog and Montaen swamp frog have been coined for it.

Names

Description
Based on the holotype and another syntopic specimen, adult females measure  in snout–vent length. The head is wider than the body and the snout is long and bluntly rounded in dorsal view, almost truncate in lateral view. The tympanum is distinct. The fingers have no webbing whereas the toes are almost fully webbed. The finger tips are flattened and expanded; the toe tips are pointed and bearing discs with circum-marginal grooves. The holotype is bleached, light-tan colored with three narrow bars in the thighs three to four in the shanks. The other specimen is better preserved and has uniform medium brown dorsum, bearing a hing of dark brown canthal stripe and face mask.

Habitat and conservation
Papurana grisea presumably inhabits streams in rainforests.

References

grisea
Amphibians of Western New Guinea
Endemic fauna of Indonesia
Amphibians described in 1913
Taxa named by Pieter Nicolaas van Kampen